NATIVE Records is a UK-based Nigerian record label owned by NATIVE Networks and formed by The Native magazine co-founders Chubbziano and Teezee. In 2022, following the release of the NATIVE Sound System debut long-play NATIVEWORLD on 18 August 2022, the record label was unveiled to the public. The label is home to Teezee, NATIVE Sound System, Odumodublvck, and Smada.

History
NATIVE Records is founded by the Nigerian music magazine The Native in 2022, as a division of NATIVE Networks. The label is headed by its co-presidents Seni Saraki, Teni Zaccheaus, and Sholz Fagbemi. On 20 September 2022, the label went into a joint venture partnership with the multinational label Def Jam, with the sole aim to sign and develop talents in Africa and its diaspora.

On 23 November 2022, NATIVE announced the signing of its first recording act Odumodublvck, and went on to release his first single with the label, titled "Picanto" featuring ECko Miles, and Zlatan. On 29 November 2022, Teezee announce the signing of Smada. and released his first single with the label, titled "Ye Anthem", featuring King Perryy and Toyé, with an accompanying music video.

On 5 December 2022, Odumodu Blvck dropped the official video of 'Picanto' featuring Zlatan and Ecko Miles.  On 6 December 2022, Smada released a new version of "Ye Anthem", featuring DJ Yk Mule, with another version released on 8 December 2022, titled "Ye Anthem (Mellow & Sleazy Remix)", with a guest appearance from Mellow & Sleazy. The same day, the label co-president Teni Zaccheaus (aka. Teezee), released his first single under the label, titled "Manhattan" featuring Cruel Santino, with production from GMK.

Artists

Current acts

Discography

Studio albums

Singles

References

Nigerian record labels
2022 establishments in the United Kingdom